Italdesign Giugiaro S.p.A. is a design and engineering company and brand based in Moncalieri, Italy, that traces its roots to the 1968 foundation of Studi Italiani Realizzazione Prototipi S.p.A. by Giorgetto Giugiaro and Aldo Mantovani. Best known for its automobile design work, Italdesign also offers product design, project management, styling, packaging, engineering, modeling, prototyping and testing services to manufacturers worldwide. As of 2010, Italdesign employs 800 people.

On August 9, 2010, Volkswagen Group subsidiary Audi's subsidiary Lamborghini acquired 90.1% of the shares of Italdesign Giugiaro S.p.A., including the brand name rights and patents. The remaining shares were sold to Audi on 28 June 2015, with Giorgetto Giugiaro resigning from the firm at the same time.

History

Foundation

Giorgetto Giugiaro and Aldo Mantovani founded Studi Italiani Realizzazione Prototipi S.p.A., the company that would eventually become Italdesign, on February 13, 1968, in Moncalieri, Italy.

Volkswagen
Volkswagen and Italdesign have a history of working together that dates back to the early 1970s.

Former Volkswagen AG Chairman Ferdinand Piëch apprenticed at Italdesign during the summer of 1972, learning about engineering and design. Italdesign is responsible for the design of several notable Volkswagen vehicles including the first generation Volkswagen Golf (1974), Volkswagen Scirocco (1974) and Volkswagen Passat (1973) and the Audi 80 (1974).

In May 2010, Italdesign agreed to transfer 90.1% of its shares to Audi AG subsidiary Lamborghini Holding S.p.A. in order to keep Volkswagen's Italian holdings bundled together. The purchase price was not disclosed. The Giugiaro family retained ownership of the remaining shares. Both Giorgetto Giugiaro and his son, Fabrizio Giugiaro, continued to have active roles in the company. In July 2015 it was announced that Giorgetto Giugiaro had left and sold the remaining shares to Audi AG.

Subsidiaries
Following a large-scale cooperation with SEAT - already dating back to the 1980s - Italdesign created a new firm, Diseño Industrial Italdesign Srl, in SEAT's hometown Barcelona, Spain, in 1992 to design and construct models, master models and prototypes for the Spanish manufacturing industry. This subsidiary is known today as Italdesign Giugiaro Barcelona SL.
In 2017 the company founded a daughter company dedicated to building collector vehicles. Named ITALDESIGN AUTOMOBILI SPECIALI, the new brand will feature on all vehicles constructed in ultra low series production, aimed at a number of selected collectors. The first car to be produced is the Zerouno with a production of only five units.

Automobili Speciali Cars

Cars produced or planned by the new group.

Acquisitions
Italdesign acquired SALLIG, a company founded in 1960 that designs and builds acrylic, cast iron and zamak matrices for automotive, aeronautical and household appliance prototypes.

Italdesign acquired ETM (Engineering Technologies Methods), a company founded in 1984 that creates silicone prototypes, allowing the transition from an acrylic prototype to a more refined prototype with characteristics similar to the finished product.

Organization
Italdesign-Giugiaro S.p.A. is headquartered 10 km south of Turin, Italy, in Moncalieri. Best known for its automobile design work, Italdesign also offers project management, styling, packaging, engineering, modeling, prototyping and testing services.

Italdesign has 993 employees and generated over €193 million revenue in 2015.

Under Volkswagen Group ownership, Rupert Stadler is the Chairman of the Board and Jörg Astalosch is CEO.

Automotive design work
Italdesign has been credited for the design of a wide variety of concept and production cars since the firm's founding in 1968.

Notable designers
 Giorgetto Giugiaro
 Fabrizio Giugiaro
 Carlo Gaino

References

Sources

External links

 Coachbuild.com Encyclopedia: Italdesign Giugiaro

 
Italian companies established in 1968
Design companies established in 1968
Design companies of Italy
Companies based in Turin
Audi
Italian brands